The 1997–98 Wessex Football League was the 12th season of the Wessex Football League. The league champions for the second consecutive season and the third time in their history were AFC Lymington, before their merger with New Milton Town of the Hampshire League. Runners-up Andover were promoted to the Southern League as Lymington's ground was not of the required standard for promotion. Romsey Town finished bottom and were relegated, and Ryde Sports resigned during the season.

For sponsorship reasons, the league was known as the Jewson Wessex League.

League table
The league consisted of one division of 21 clubs, the same as the previous season, after Petersfield Town were relegated and one new club joined:
A.F.C. Newbury, joining from the Hampshire League.

References

Wessex Football League seasons
9